Town Bridge Halt railway station served Town Bridge near Stranorlar in County Donegal, Ireland.

The station opened on 1 May 1934 on the Finn Valley Railway line from Strabane to Stranorlar.

It closed on 15 December 1947.

Routes

References

Disused railway stations in County Donegal
Railway stations opened in 1934
Railway stations closed in 1947
1934 establishments in Ireland
Railway stations in the Republic of Ireland opened in the 20th century